Ali A Haydar is Lebanese physician who is an emeritus professor at the American University of Beirut and is the Chief Medical Officer at Aman Hospital, Doha, Qatar and previously the Chairman of radiology at the Clemenceau Medical Center affiliated with Johns Hopkins International since 2018. He is also a member of the Radiological Society of North America, British society of Interventional and Cardiovascular Radiology and the Cardiovascular and Interventional Radiological Society of Europe and fellow of the Pan Arab Interventional radiology society.

Life and career
Haydar completed his BSc in Chemistry in 1996 and then pursued Medical Doctorate from the American University of Beirut in 2000. In 2005, he became member of the Royal College of Physicians and member of the Royal College of Radiologists. In 2008, he became Fellow of the Royal College of Radiologists.

Dr. Ali Haydar is dual trained in Internal Medicine/nephrology obtained in 2005 from Guys and St Thomas NHS trust London and in radiology with a certificate of completion of training CCT from London Deanery in 2010. He was a fellow of Interventional radiology at Imperial college for two years. In 2010-2011 Haydar joined St Bartholomew and The London as consultant in Interventional and cross sectional radiology.

From 2004 to 2006, Haydar peer-reviewed for the American Journal of Kidney Diseases and Nephrology Dialysis and Transplantation, Kidney International and the Lancet in addition to many other radiology journals. He was included in the Who's who medical directory in 2008.

Haydar is also a scientific peer reviewer for the CardioVascular and Interventional Radiology and Diagnostic and Interventional Radiology journals, where he was awarded in 2018 the award of most active reviewer. In 2015 he was selected as the treasurer of Pan Arab Interventional Radiology Society and in 2020, he became a Fellow of the Pan Arab Interventional Radiology Society.

Major publications

References
  
 
 
 

Living people
Academic staff of the American University of Beirut
Lebanese radiologists
Alumni of Imperial College London
Fellows of the Royal College of Radiologists
Academics of Imperial College London
Fellows of the Royal College of Physicians
Year of birth missing (living people)